The Characeae or stoneworts are a family of green algae. This is a partial list of species found in Britain and Ireland.

British Isles
Ref: Stewart & Church (1992).
Chara baltica Bruz.
Chara canescens Desv. & Lois.
Chara connivens Salzm. ex A.Braun
Chara curta Nolta ex Kütz. (=C. aspera var. curta)
Chara denudata (A.Braun) R.D.Wood
Chara fragifera Durieu
Chara intermedia Braun (=C. papillosa Kütz. and C. contraria x hispida)
Chara mucosa J.Groves & Bullock-Webster
Chara rudis (A.Braun) Leonh.
Chara tomentosa L.
Lamprothamnium papulosum (Wallr.) J.Groves
Nitella capillaris (Krocker) J.Groves & Bullock-Webster
Nitella gracilis (Smith) Agardh
Nitella hyalina (DC.)Agardh
Nitella mucronata (A.Braun)Miquel
Nitella spanioclema J.Groves & Bullock-Webster (Nitella flexilis var. spanioclema (J.Groves & Bullock-Webster))
Nitella tenuissima (Desv.) Kütz.
Nitellopsis obtusa (Desv.) J.Groves
Tolypella intricata (Trent. ex Roth) Leonh.
Tolypella nidifica (O.F.Müll.) Leonh. (=Tolypella nidifica var. nidifica)
Tolypella prolifera (Ziz. ex A.Braun) Leonh.

Ireland
 County Antrim
 Chara aspera var. aspera 
 Chara globularis var. globularis 
 Chara vulgaris var. papillata Wallr. ex A. Braun
 Chara globularis var. virgata (Kützing) R.D.Wood
 Chara vulgaris var. vulgaris 
 Chara vulgaris var. contraria (A.Braun ex Kützing) J.A. Moore
 Chara vulgaris var. longibracteata (Kützing) J. Groves & Bullock-Webster
 Chara vulgaris var. papillata Wallr. ex A. Braun
 Nitella flexilis var. flexilis 
 Nitella translucens (Pers.) C.A. Ag.
 Tolypella nidifica var. glomerata (Desv.) R.D.Wood
 County Down
 Chara aspera var. aspera 
 Chara aspera var. curta (Nolte ex Kützing) Braun ex Leonh.
 Chara globularis var. globularis 
 Chara vulgaris var. papillata Wallr. ex A. Braun
 Chara globularis var. virgata (Kützing) R.D.Wood
 Chara globularis var. annulata (Lilleblad) J.A.Moore
 Chara hispida L.
 Chara hispida var. hispida 
 Chara hispida var. major (Hartm.) R.D. Wood
 Chara hispida var. rudis A. Braun
 Chara pedunculata Kützing
 Chara vulgaris var. vulgaris 
 Chara vulgaris var. contraria (A.Braun ex Kützing) J.A. Moore
 Chara vulgaris var. longibracteata (Kützing) J. Groves & Bullock-Webster
 Chara vulgaris var. papillata Wallr. ex A. Braun
 Nitella flexilis var. flexilis 
 Nitella translucens (Pers) C.A. Ag.
 Tolypella nidifica var. glomerata (Desv.) R.D.Wood
 County Londonderry
 Chara aspera Deth. ex Willd. var. aspera 
 Chara vulgaris var. papillata Wallr. ex A. Braun
 Chara globularis var. globularis 
 Chara globularis var. virgata (Kützing) R.D.Wood
 Chara hispida L.
 Chara hispida var. hispida 
 Chara vulgaris var. vulgaris 
 Chara vulgaris var. contraria (A.Braun ex Kützing) J.A. Moore
 Chara vulgaris var. papillata Wallr. ex A. Braun
 Nitella flexilis var. flexilis 
 Nitella translucens (Pers) C.A. Ag.
 Tolypella nidifica var. glomerata (Desv.) R.D.Wood
 County Mayo.Recent records have been published from Clare Island.
 Chara virgata Kützing
 Nitella flexilis (Linnaeus) C.Agardh
 Nitella translucens (Persoon) C.Agardh

References

Charophyta
Lists of plant species
Lists of plants by location